The Braille pattern dots-56 is a 6-dot braille cell with the middle and bottom right dots raised, or an 8-dot braille cell with the upper-middle and lower-middle right dots raised. It is represented by the Unicode code point U+2830, and in Braille ASCII with a semicolon: ;.

Unified Braille

In unified international braille, the braille pattern dots-56 is used as a punctuation or formatting sign, or otherwise as needed.

Table of unified braille values

Other braille

Plus dots 7 and 8

Related to Braille pattern dots-56 are Braille patterns 567, 568, and 5678, which are used in 8-dot braille systems, such as Gardner-Salinas and Luxembourgish Braille.

Related 8-dot kantenji patterns

In the Japanese kantenji braille, the standard 8-dot Braille patterns 68, 168, 468, and 1468 are the patterns related to Braille pattern dots-56, since the two additional dots of kantenji patterns 056, 567, and 0567 are placed above the base 6-dot cell, instead of below, as in standard 8-dot braille.

Kantenji using braille patterns 68, 168, 468, or 1468

This listing includes kantenji using Braille pattern dots-56 for all 6349 kanji found in JIS C 6226-1978.

The kantenji  is used in indicating most of the common (non-banking) number kanji, as well as the classical heavenly stem ordinals.

  - 数

Variants and thematic compounds

  -  selector 4 + 数  =  勿
  -  比 + 数  =  右

Compounds of 勿

  -  れ/口 + 数  =  吻
  -  数 + 心  =  忽
  -  日 + 数  =  易
  -  仁/亻 + 数  =  傷
  -  つ/土 + 数  =  場
  -  つ/土 + つ/土 + 数  =  塲
  -  て/扌 + 数  =  揚
  -  し/巿 + 数  =  暢
  -  に/氵 + 数  =  湯
  -  ⺼ + に/氵 + 数  =  盪
  -  く/艹 + に/氵 + 数  =  蕩
  -  や/疒 + 数  =  瘍
  -  ⺼ + 数  =  腸
  -  ⺼ + ⺼ + 数  =  膓
  -  囗 + 数  =  觴
  -  を/貝 + 数  =  賜
  -  か/金 + 数  =  錫
  -  さ/阝 + 数  =  陽
  -  ぬ/力 + 日 + 数  =  剔
  -  む/車 + 日 + 数  =  蜴
  -  ね/示 + 日 + 数  =  裼
  -  せ/食 + 日 + 数  =  鯣
  -  る/忄 + 宿 + 数  =  慯
  -  日 + 宿 + 数  =  暘
  -  心 + 宿 + 数  =  楊
  -  ほ/方 + 宿 + 数  =  殤
  -  火 + 宿 + 数  =  煬
  -  む/車 + 宿 + 数  =  蝪
  -  そ/馬 + 数  =  物
  -  の/禾 + 数  =  黎
  -  ぬ/力 + selector 4 + 数  =  刎
  -  日 + selector 4 + 数  =  昜
  -  ち/竹 + selector 4 + 数  =  笏

Compounds of 右

  -  く/艹 + 数  =  若
  -  も/門 + 数  =  匿
  -  る/忄 + も/門 + 数  =  慝
  -  え/訁 + 数  =  諾
  -  る/忄 + く/艹 + 数  =  惹
  -  ね/示 + 数  =  祐
  -  な/亻 + 比 + 数  =  佑
  -  せ/食 + 比 + 数  =  醢

Compounds of numbers

  -  数 + #1  =  一
  -  ふ/女 + 数 + selector 1  =  丕
  -  数 + #2  =  二
  -  数 + #3  =  三
  -  数 + #4  =  四
  -  に/氵 + 数 + る/忄  =  泗
  -  そ/馬 + 数 + る/忄  =  駟
  -  数 + #5  =  五
  -  な/亻 + 数 + ら/月  =  伍
  -  数 + #6  =  六
  -  う/宀/#3 + 数 + え/訁  =  宍
  -  数 + #7  =  七
  -  数 + #8  =  八
  -  れ/口 + 数 + り/分  =  叭
  -  か/金 + 数 + り/分  =  釟
  -  数 + #9  =  九
  -  と/戸 + 数  =  尻
  -  日 + 数 + お/頁  =  旭
  -  ひ/辶 + 数 + お/頁  =  馗
  -  数 + め/目  =  百
  -  な/亻 + 数 + め/目  =  佰
  -  ゆ/彳 + 数 + め/目  =  弼
  -  心 + 数 + め/目  =  栢
  -  か/金 + 数 + め/目  =  瓸
  -  ま/石 + 数 + め/目  =  竡
  -  の/禾 + 数 + め/目  =  粨
  -  そ/馬 + 数 + め/目  =  貊
  -  さ/阝 + 数 + め/目  =  陌
  -  数 + せ/食  =  千
  -  な/亻 + 数 + せ/食  =  仟
  -  ぬ/力 + 数 + せ/食  =  刋
  -  ま/石 + 数 + せ/食  =  竏
  -  さ/阝 + 数 + せ/食  =  阡
  -  数 + ま/石  =  万
  -  数 + 数 + ま/石  =  萬
  -  の/禾 + 数 + ま/石  =  糲
  -  や/疒 + 数 + ま/石  =  癘
  -  む/車 + 数 + ま/石  =  蛎
  -  心 + 数 + ま/石  =  栃
  -  ま/石 + 数 + ま/石  =  砺
  -  き/木 + 数 + る/忄  =  楞
  -  心 + 龸 + 数  =  杤
  -  数 + 宿  =  兆
  -  な/亻 + 数 + 宿  =  佻
  -  て/扌 + 数 + 宿  =  挑
  -  日 + 数 + 宿  =  晁
  -  う/宀/#3 + 数 + 宿  =  窕
  -  か/金 + 数 + 宿  =  銚
  -  数 + な/亻  =  億
  -  数 + と/戸  =  廿
  -  数 + よ/广  =  丗
  -  数 + 数 + よ/广  =  卅

Compounds of heavenly stems

  -  数 + こ/子  =  甲
  -  も/門 + 数 + こ/子  =  匣
  -  れ/口 + 数 + こ/子  =  呷
  -  け/犬 + 数 + こ/子  =  狎
  -  ⺼ + 数 + こ/子  =  胛
  -  数 + を/貝  =  乙
  -  や/疒 + 数 + を/貝  =  乢
  -  て/扌 + 数 + を/貝  =  扎
  -  数 + へ/⺩  =  丙
  -  火 + 数 + へ/⺩  =  炳
  -  さ/阝 + 数 + へ/⺩  =  陋
  -  と/戸 + 数 + へ/⺩  =  鞆
  -  数 + て/扌  =  丁
  -  れ/口 + 数 + て/扌  =  叮
  -  に/氵 + 数 + て/扌  =  汀
  -  た/⽥ + 数 + て/扌  =  甼
  -  や/疒 + 数 + て/扌  =  疔
  -  ま/石 + 数 + て/扌  =  竚
  -  い/糹/#2 + 数 + て/扌  =  紵
  -  心 + 数 + て/扌  =  苧
  -  せ/食 + 数 + て/扌  =  酊
  -  数 + ひ/辶  =  戊
  -  数 + き/木  =  己
  -  心 + 数 + き/木  =  杞
  -  数 + の/禾  =  庚
  -  数 + に/氵  =  壬
  -  ふ/女 + 数 + に/氵  =  婬
  -  ね/示 + 数 + に/氵  =  衽
  -  数 + す/発  =  癸
  -  て/扌 + 数 + す/発  =  揆

Other compounds

  -  数 + ち/竹  =  父
  -  数 + し/巿  =  寸
  -  き/木 + 数  =  束
  -  ぬ/力 + 数  =  勅
  -  ぬ/力 + ぬ/力 + 数  =  敕
  -  ん/止 + 数  =  整
  -  氷/氵 + 数  =  瀬
  -  よ/广 + 数  =  疎
  -  ま/石 + 数  =  辣
  -  ひ/辶 + 数  =  速
  -  お/頁 + 数  =  頼
  -  る/忄 + き/木 + 数  =  悚
  -  selector 1 + き/木 + 数  =  朿
  -  ち/竹 + 数  =  策
  -  き/木 + き/木 + 数  =  棗
  -  心 + き/木 + 数  =  棘
  -  ま/石 + き/木 + 数  =  竦
  -  み/耳 + き/木 + 数  =  踈
  -  心 + 数 + 数  =  蕀
  -  ふ/女 + お/頁 + 数  =  嬾
  -  る/忄 + お/頁 + 数  =  懶
  -  け/犬 + お/頁 + 数  =  獺
  -  や/疒 + お/頁 + 数  =  癩
  -  ち/竹 + お/頁 + 数  =  籟
  -  心 + お/頁 + 数  =  藾
  -  ゑ/訁 + 数  =  讐
  -  そ/馬 + 数 + り/分  =  尓
  -  数 + う/宀/#3 + 龸  =  卍
  -  く/艹 + 宿 + 数  =  薮
  -  ゑ/訁 + 宿 + 数  =  讎
  -  数 + 数 + 数  =  數
  -  う/宀/#3 + 宿 + 数  =  窶
  -  ち/竹 + 宿 + 数  =  籔
  -  く/艹 + 龸 + 数  =  藪
  -  数 + か/金 + ら/月  =  髏

Notes

Braille patterns